Equb or Iqub (Amharic: እቁብ) is an association of people in Ethiopian culture with the aim of mobilizing resources, especially finance, and distributing them on a rotating basis. It is distinguished from Eder by duration of time; Equb is temporary or permanent, while Eder is long-term association. Like Eder, Equb is a cooperative social institution, which helps for funeral insurance where community members elect their leaders, contribute resources either in kind or in cash and support the mourning member.

In Konso community, Equb dominates other financial establishments of micro and small enterprises, expansion and their working capital finance, followed by personal saving, families and relatives.

References

Banking in Ethiopia
Social institutions
Ethiopian culture